Scammon Bay Airport  is a state-owned public-use airport located in Scammon Bay, a city in the Kusilvak Census Area of the U.S. state of Alaska.

Facilities 
It has one runways designated 10/28 with a 3,000 by 75 feet (914 x 23 m) gravel surface, and one seaplane landing area designated 4W/22W which measures 10,000 by 500 feet (3,048 x 152 m).

Airlines and destinations

References

External links 
 FAA Alaska airport diagram (GIF)
 

Airports in the Kusilvak Census Area, Alaska